The Southern Bell Telephone Company Building, now known as the AT&T Communications Building, is the main telephone exchange for downtown Atlanta, Georgia. It is located at 51 Peachtree Center Avenue, on the northeast corner of Auburn Avenue.

It was designed for Southern Bell by Marye, Alger and Vinour, in an austere art deco style. Originally planned to be 25 stories in height, which would have made it the tallest building in Atlanta, it was completed in 1929 at six stories. Additions in 1947, 1948 and 1963 brought it to its present 14 stories.

The building is crowned by a microwave communications tower.

References

External links

 Atlanta Telephone History - 51 Ivy

Commercial buildings on the National Register of Historic Places in Georgia (U.S. state)
Infrastructure completed in 1929
Skyscraper office buildings in Atlanta
Art Deco skyscrapers
Art Deco architecture in Georgia (U.S. state)
Telephone exchange buildings
Telecommunications buildings on the National Register of Historic Places
National Register of Historic Places in Atlanta